Sami Levi (born April 13, 1981 in Istanbul) is the soloist of the Turkish band Sefarad. He graduated in 1998 from the Göztepe Lisesi school in Istanbul.

Solo career
Recently, he started his solo career, while still collaborating with Ceki Benşuşe of Sefarad. Of his solo career, he has released three albums: a maxi-single, Hade Hade - Duke Duke and a full album, Disco Kolbastı ve Balkan Havaları and SAMİ - Seve Seve 2011 www.ttnetmuzik.com.tr/samiseveseve

Discography
Sefarad (2003) (with Sefarad)
Sefarad II (2005) (with Sefarad)
Evvel Zaman (2007) (with Sefarad)
Hade Hade Duke Duke (2008)
Disco Kolbastı ve Balkan Havaları (2009)
Seve Seve (2011)

See also
 Turkish pop music
 Music of Turkey
 List of Turkish pop music performers

References

External links
Sami Levi in the TV news in Turkey; the news are about his most recent single, "Kimler Geçti Alemde (Hade Hade)"

1981 births
Judaeo-Spanish-language singers
Living people
Singers from Istanbul
Turkish Jews
Turkish male singers